Raffael may refer to:

 Raffael or Raphael, Italian painter
 Raffael or Raphael (given name), given name
 Raffael (footballer),  Brazilian footballer 
 Joseph Raffael, American contemporary realist painter